"Se Desintegra El Amor" (English: "Love It decays") is the fourth single by Mexican singer Paty Cantú and the singer Benny Ibarra from her second studio album, Afortunadamente No Eres Tú, released in 2010.

Music video
The video for the song was directed by Fausto Terán, and was filmed in Miami and New York City, leveraging the singer's visit to the U.S. in connection with the promotion of her studio album "Afortunadamente No Eres Tú".

Trackslisting

Charts

Release history

References

External links
"Se Desintegra El Amor" music video at YouTube.com

2011 singles
Paty Cantú songs
Spanish-language songs
2011 songs
Songs written by Paty Cantú
EMI Records singles